Michael Larson was a TV game show contestant.

Michael Larson may also refer to:

Michael Larson (businessman) (born 1959), American money manager
Michael Larson, actor in The Scam Artist
Michael Larson, musician in Psykosonik

See also
Michael Larsen (disambiguation)